Bushido: Code of the Warrior was a professional wrestling pay-per-view (PPV) event produced by Dragon Gate USA that was first ever live Internet pay-per-view.

Results

2010

External links
DGUSA.tv

Dragon Gate USA shows
2010 in professional wrestling
2010 in Massachusetts
Professional wrestling in Massachusetts
Entertainment events in Massachusetts
Fall River, Massachusetts
History of Bristol County, Massachusetts